The 2nd Pontieri Engineer Regiment is a military engineer regiment of the Italian Army based in Piacenza in the Emilia Romagna. Today the regiment is administratively assigned to the army's Engineer Command and the army's sole unit focusing on operational level water crossings. The term "Pontieri" comes from the Italian word for bridge and is used to denote units of the engineer arm tasked with the construction and repair of bridges. Enlisted personnel in such units are addressed by the singular form: "Pontiere". The regiment was formed in 1883 as an engineer regiment, which united all the Pontieri companies of the Royal Italian Army. During World War I the regiment formed battalions and companies, which operated along the Italian front. In 1933 the regiment was split into the 1st Pontieri Regiment (Light Bridges) and 2nd Pontieri Regiment (Heavy Bridges). During World War II the regiment formed battalions and smaller units, which were deployed on all fronts. The regiment was disbanded by invading German forces after the announcement of the Armistice of Cassibile on 8 September 1943. The regiment was reformed in 1949 and has been active since.

History 
On 1 January 1883 the Royal Italian Army formed the 4th Engineer Regiment (Pontieri) in Piacenza. The 1st Engineer Regiment and 2nd Engineer Regiment provided each four Pontieri companies and one train company. The 2nd Engineer Regiment also transferred its 14th Lagunari Company in Venice to the new regiment. The 1st Pontieri Company, which arrived from the 2nd Engineer Regiment, had distinguished itself in the First Italian War of Independence during the Siege of Peschiera in May 1848 and been awarded a Bronze Medal of Military Valour, which was affixed to the flag of the newly formed regiment.

On 23 June 1887 the regiment changed its name to 4th Engineer Regiment. The same year the regiment transferred four sappers and a train company to the 3rd Engineer Regiment, which in turn transferred its Ferrovieri brigade with four companies in Turin to the 4th Engineer Regiment. On 1 November 1887 the regiment consisted of a staff, three Pontieri brigades (with eight companies), a Ferrovieri brigade (with four companies), a Lagunari brigade (with two companies), three train companies, and a depot.

On 1 July 1895 the Ferrovieri brigade in Turin became an autonomous brigade, which on 9 August 1910 was reorganized as 6th Engineer Regiment (Ferrovieri). The same year the brigades were renamed battalions and on 1 November 1895 the regiment was renamed 4th Engineer Regiment (Pontieri). The regiment provided three officers and 793 enlisted to fill out units that were deployed for the Italo-Turkish War in 1911–12.

World War I 
During World War I battalions and companies formed by the regiment fought in all sectors of the Italian front. In total the regiment formed six Pontieri battalion commands and 23 Pontieri companies, six Lagunari companies, two siege park companies, a river guides company, a hydraulic operators company, four bridge sections for cavalry, and three territorial militia companies. The regiment's units fought in eleven battles on the Isonzo river. After the Twelfth Battle of the Isonzo the Pontieri built bridges over the Torre and Tagliamento rivers to allow the Italian 3rd Army to escape. During the battles along the Piave river the Pontieri enabled the army to cross the river during the decisive Battle of Vittorio Veneto.

8th Engineer Regiment (Lagunari) 
On 28 August 1918 the 8th Engineer Regiment (Lagunari) was formed in Ferrara and all units of this engineer speciality were transferred to the new regiment. The regiment consisted of a command, the I Lagunari Battalion in Venice with the 9th, 15th, 20th, and 23rd company, and the II Lagunari Battalion with the 10th, 21st, 22nd, and 24th company in Ferrara. In October 1918 the regiment formed the 1st Train Company and the same month the regiment's companies were heavily engaged in the Piave delta during the Battle of Vittorio Veneto. In November 1918 the regiment moved to Venice, where it was disbanded on 21 November 1919. The last remaining battalion of the regiment with two Lagunari companies returned on the same date to the 4th Engineer Regiment (Pontieri), which was renamed Pontieri and Lagunari Engineer Regiment.

Interwar years 
At the end of 1918 the 4th Engineer Regiment (Pontieri) still had six battalions and 26 companies, as well as the four four bridge sections for cavalry deployed along the former war zone to repair damaged bridges. On 21 November 1919 the 8th Engineer Regiment (Lagunari) was disbanded and transferred its remaining Lagunari battalion to the 4th Engineer Regiment (Pontieri), which on the same date was renamed Pontieri and Lagunari Engineer Regiment. The regiment now consisted of a command, three Pontieri battalions, a Lagunari battalion in Venice, and a depot.

On 1 March 1926 the regiment changed its name to Pontieri and Lagunari Regiment and on 31 December of the year it consisted of a command, the I and III Pontieri battalions in Piacenza, the II Pontieri battalion in Verona, the IV Pontieri battalion in Rome, the V Lagunari battalion in Venice, and depot.

On 15 May 1933 the regiment was split into the 1st Pontieri Regiment (Light Bridges) and 2nd Pontieri Regiment (Heavy Bridges). The 1st Pontieri Regiment was based in Verona and received the II Pontieri Battalion in Verona, IV Pontieri Battalion in Rome, and V Lagunari Battalion in Venice. The 2nd Pontieri Regiment retained the flag of the Pontieri and Lagunari Regiment and received the I and III Pontieri battalions in Piacenza.

For the Second Italo-Ethiopian War in 1935-36 the regiment formed in 1935 the following units:
 three special Pontieri companies (one for Somalia and two for Eritrea)
 one special Pontieri unit (for Somalia)
 one Pontieri Company (for Libya)
 one special truck-transported Pontieri unit (for Somalia)

On 10 January 1936 the III Mixed Pontieri Battalion for motorized division was formed and in December 1936 the 7th, 8th, 9th Pontieri companies were formed as replacements for units serving in Ethiopia. On 1 October 1938 the battalions were reorganized as mixed bridges battalions: the I battalion now consisted of two light bridges companies and a heavy bridges company, while the II battalion consisted of a light bridges company and a heavy bridges company.

World War II 
With the outbreak of World War II the regiment's depot began to mobilize new units:

 I, XXXI, XXXII, and XXXVII Pontieri battalions (light bridges)
 XXXII Pontieri Battalion (heavy bridges)
 XXIII Pontieri Battalion (light truck-transported bridges)
 and dozens of autonomous Pontieri companies and sections

In summer 1941 the I Pontieri Battalion was assigned to the Italian Expeditionary Corps in Russia and deployed to Ukraine. For this and its conduct during the Italian campaign in the Soviet Union the I Pontieri Battalion was awarded a Bronze Medal of Military Valour.

The 2nd Pontieri Regiment was disbanded by invading German forces after the announcement of the Armistice of Cassibile on 8 September 1943.

Cold War 
On 15 December 1949 the 2nd Pontieri Engineer Regiment was reformed in Piacenza and assigned to the Tuscan-Emilian Military Region. The regiment consisted of a command, command platoon (expanded to Command Company in 1951), a pontieri battalion with one training company and one operations company, a Ferrovieri battalion with two dismountable metal bridges companies based in Castel Maggiore, a railway operations company based in Turin, and a park company. The Railway Operations Company operated the Chivasso–Ivrea–Aosta railway.

In 1950 the regiment began a tradition to erect the temporary bridge for the yearly Festa del Redentore in Venice. The tradition continued until the end of obligatory military service in 2000. For its work after the Polesine floods in November 1951 the regiment was awarded a Silver Medal of Civil Valour.

On 1 March 1953 the regiment raised a second and third Pontieri engineer battalion, with the former being based in Legnano. On 1 January 1954 the Ferrovieri Battalion became an autonomous unit, which on 1 October 1957 was expanded to Ferrovieri Engineer Regiment. On the same date the II Pontieri Engineer Battalion in Legnano and the Railway Operations Company were transferred to the Ferrovieri Engineer Regiment. On 1 February 1964 the II Pontieri Engineer Battalion was reassigned to the 2nd Pontieri Engineer Regiment. On 6 September 1974 the I Pontieri Engineer Battalion was put into reserve status and afterwards switched numbers with the II Pontieri Engineer Battalion.

After the 1975 army reform the regiment was assigned to the Engineering Inspectorate and its organization was as follows:

  2nd Pontieri Engineer Regiment, in Piacenza
 Command and Services Platoon, in Piacenza
 1st Pontieri Engineer Battalion, in Legnago
 2nd Pontieri Engineer Battalion (Reserve), in Piacenza
 3rd Pontieri Engineer Battalion, in Piacenza

Recent times 
On 22 September 1992 the 2nd Pontieri Engineer Regiment's 1st Pontieri Engineer Battalion in Legnano became an autonomous unit under the Northeastern Military Region. The battalion was assigned the flag and traditions of the 1st Pontieri Regiment. On 31 August 1995 the battalion was renamed 5th Engineer Battalion "Bolsena" and the flag of the 1st Pontieri Regiment was returned to the Shrine of the Flags in the Vittoriano in Rome.

On 1 December 1997 the 2nd Pontieri Engineer Regiment passed from the Tuscan-Emilian Military Region to the army's Engineer Grouping, which on 10 September 2010 became the Engineer Command.

After the August 2016 earthquake in Central Italy the regiment was deployed to the area and remained there until April 2017, rebuilding roads and bridges, and providing engineering services to the affected communities. For its service the regiment was awarded Gold Cross of Army Merit.

Current structure 

As of 2023 the 2nd Pontieri Engineer Regiment consists of:

  Regimental Command, in Piacenza
 Command and Logistic Support Company
 I Battalion
 1st Pontieri Engineer Company
 2nd Pontieri Engineer Company
 Special Equipment and Construction Company
 Road- and Earthworks Company

The Command and Logistic Support Company fields the following platoons: C3 Platoon, Transport and Materiel Platoon, Medical Platoon, Commissariat Platoon, and EOD Platoon. The two Pontieri engineer companies are equipped with French Motorized Floating Bridges, while the other two companies are equipped with a variety of cranes, excavators, etc.

External links
Italian Army Website: 2° Reggimento Genio Pontieri

References

Engineer Regiments of Italy